Dance, My Doll (Swedish: Dansa, min docka) is a 1953 Swedish comedy film directed by Martin Söderhjelm and starring Nils Poppe, Gunnar Björnstrand, Adolf Jahr and Inga Landgré. It was shot at the Råsunda Studios in Stockholm. The film's sets were designed by the art director Nils Svenwall.

The film premiered on 20 July 1953 at the Spegeln cinema in Stockholm. It has been shown several times on SVT, including 1991, 1994 and in January 2021.

Cast
 Nils Poppe as 	Sebastian Pettersson
 Gunnar Björnstrand as 	Zdenko Zapatil
 Adolf Jahr as 	Albin Kvist
 Inga Landgré as 	Elise
 Kenne Fant as 	Holger
 Gull Natorp as 	Mrs. Uggla
 Märta Dorff as 	Hildur
 Dagmar Ebbesen as 	Mrs. Valldin
 Ragnvi Lindbladh as 	Lilly
 Henrik Schildt as 	Erik, gangster
 Börje Mellvig as 	Bertold
 Helge Hagerman as 	Svensson
 Fritiof Billquist as 	Svedje, Bertold's assistant 
 Arne Lindblad as 	Tramp
 Paul Baudisch as 	Gustav Steneman 
 Frithiof Bjärne as 	Policeman 
 Tor Borong as 	Barbershop Customer 
 Bengt Eklund as 	Lundvall - Engineer 
 Gösta Ericsson as 	Supervisor 
 Claes Esphagen as 	Gentleman 
 Semmy Friedmann as 	Berg - Music Teacher 
 Fritjof Hellberg as 	Policeman 
 Gustaf Hiort af Ornäs as 	Prison Guard 
 Stig Johanson as 	Worker 
 Ingmar Karlsson as Firefighter 
 Ragnar Klange as	Butcher in Skrabbarp 
 Carl-Uno Larsson as 	Boy with Stick 
 Birger Lensander as Worker 
 Curt Löwgren as 	Hairdresser 
 Carl Nydahl as 	Policeman 
 Olav Riégo as Wallgren 
 Hilding Rolin as 	Man 
 Erik Rosén as 	Irate Man with Dog 
 Georg Skarstedt as Man Drinking Beer 
 Åke Svensson as 	Hot Dog Vendor 
 Bengt Thörnhammar as 	Worker 
 Eric von Gegerfelt as	Train Conductor

References

Bibliography 
 Qvist, Per Olov & von Bagh, Peter. Guide to the Cinema of Sweden and Finland. Greenwood Publishing Group, 2000.

External links 
 

1953 films
Swedish comedy films
1953 comedy films
1950s Swedish-language films
1950s Swedish films